Yamaguchi's 2nd district was a constituency of the House of Representatives in the Imperial Diet of Japan (national legislature). Between 1928 and 1942 it elected five representatives by single non-transferable vote (SNTV). It consisted of Yamaguchi Prefecture's Ōshima, Kuga, Kumage, Tsuno, Saba and Yoshiki districts.

The district was most notably represented by two wartime ministers: Yōsuke Matsuoka, foreign and colonial minister in the 2nd Konoe cabinet and Nobusuke Kishi, trade and industry minister in the Tōjō cabinet.

After the 1946 redistricting all of Yamaguchi formed one limited voting at-large district. In 1947, the area together with six new cities in Yamaguchi (Hōfu, Kudamatsu, Iwakuni, Hikari, Yamaguchi, Tokuyama) formed the new SNTV 2nd district of Yamaguchi. Kishi was reelected there after his release from prison for the Yoshida Liberal Party in 1953, Hatoyama's Japan Democratic Party in 1955 and later the LDP's conservative anti-mainstream where he chaired his own faction.

Elected Representatives

References 

Districts of the House of Representatives (Japan)